The following Confederate States Army units and commanders fought in the Battle of Stones River of the American Civil War. The Union order of battle is listed separately. Order of battle compiled from the army organization during the campaign, the casualty returns and the reports.

Abbreviations used

Military rank
 Gen = General
 LTG = Lieutenant General
 MG = Major General
 BG = Brigadier General
 Col = Colonel
 Ltc = Lieutenant Colonel
 Maj = Major
 Cpt = Captain
 Lt = Lieutenant

Other
 (w) = wounded
 (mw) = mortally wounded
 (k) = killed
 (c) = captured

Army of Tennessee

Gen Braxton Bragg, Commanding

Polk's Corps

LTG Leonidas Polk

Hardee's Corps

LTG William J. Hardee

Cavalry

Artillery

Notes

References
 U.S. War Department, The War of the Rebellion: a Compilation of the Official Records of the Union and Confederate Armies, U.S. Government Printing Office, 1880–1901.

American Civil War orders of battle